Gudja United Football Club is a Maltese professional football club from the south-eastern village of Gudja that currently plays in the Maltese Premier League.

Gudja United plays in blue and white striped jerseys. Their arch-rivals are Għaxaq F.C.

Players

Current squad

External links
Official website

1945 establishments in Malta
Football clubs in Malta
Gudja
Association football clubs established in 1945